Exokatakoiloi, latinized as Exocatacœli, was a term attested since the 11th century for the principal officials of the Patriarch of Constantinople or a bishop of the Eastern Church: these were the steward or oikonomos (the patriarchal official was prefixed with megas, "grand"), the treasurer or [megas] sakellarios, the sacristan or [megas] skeuophylax, the record-keeper or chartophylax, and the head of the sakellion. Later a sixth member was added, the protekdikos.

References

Sources 
 

Ecumenical Patriarchate of Constantinople
Byzantine ecclesiastical titles and offices
Eastern Christian ecclesiastical offices